Iannone is a surname. Notable people with the surname include:

Andrea Iannone (born 1989), Italian  motorcycle road racer
Bert Iannone (1917–1996), Canadian football player
Carol Iannone, conservative writer and literary critic
Claudio Iannone (born 1963), Argentine  cyclist
Dorothy Iannone (1933-2022), American-born visual artist
Filippo Iannone (born 1957), Roman Catholic church leader
Jamie Iannone, American businessman, CEO of eBay
Marvin P. Iannone, American policeman
Patrick Iannone (born 1982), Italian ice hockey player
Tommaso Iannone (born 1990), Italian rugby player

Italian-language surnames